Route 276 is a short collector road in the Canadian province of Nova Scotia. It is located in Guysborough County and connects South Lochaber at Trunk 7 with Goshen at Route 316.

Communities
South Lochaber
Goshen

Parks
Lochiel Lake Provincial Park

References

Nova Scotia provincial highways
Roads in Guysborough County, Nova Scotia